Alfred James Day (19 May 1884 – 3 July 1968) was an Australian rules footballer who played for the Geelong Football Club in the Victorian Football League (VFL).

Notes

External links 

1884 births
1968 deaths
Australian rules footballers from Geelong
Geelong Football Club players